The 1896 Mississippi A&M Aggies football team represented the Mississippi Agricultural & Mechanical College—now known as Mississippi State University during the 1896 Southern Intercollegiate Athletic Association football season. Led by J. B. Hildebrand in his first and only season as head coach, the Aggies compiled an overall record of 0–4 with a mark of 0–2 in conference play.

Schedule

References

Mississippi AandM
Mississippi State Bulldogs football seasons
College football winless seasons
Mississippi AandM Aggies football